Gregory Weldon Meeks (born September 25, 1953) is an American lawyer and politician who has been a U.S. representative from New York since 1998. He is a member of the Democratic Party and chaired the House Committee on Foreign Affairs from 2021 to 2023. He still sits on the committee as ranking member.

In the last Congress, Meeks's district included most of southeastern Queens, including Jamaica, Laurelton, Rosedale, Cambria Heights, Saint Albans, Springfield Gardens, The Rockaways, and the John F. Kennedy International Airport. It was made up largely of working-, middle-, and upper-middle-class African-American and West Indian American communities, but also included a small part of Ozone Park and part of Howard Beach known as Old Howard Beach, both of which are predominantly middle-class Italian-American communities. He also represented much of Kew Gardens and northern Richmond Hill, as well as the largely Irish American western part of Rockaway Peninsula.

Early life, education, and career
Born in East Harlem, New York City and raised in a housing project, Meeks received his B.A. degree from Adelphi University and his J.D. degree from Howard University School of Law. He is a member of Alpha Phi Alpha fraternity. He worked as an Assistant District Attorney and for the Special Narcotics Prosecutor for the City of New York before joining the Investigations Commission on official misconduct and organized crime. He then was Supervising Judge for the New York State Workers Compensation System. Meeks was a member of the New York State Assembly (31st D.) from 1993 to 1998.

House of Representatives

Elections

2008

Meeks was criticized for initially supporting Hillary Clinton over Barack Obama for president. His House primary election challenger was to be Ruben Wills, a former chief of staff for State Senator Shirley Huntley and an organizer for Obama. Wills said, "I was on board with Obama from Day 1; Meeks had to be dragged across the line." Some suggested that a young black political class was seeking to assert the neighborhood's power against what it saw as an older establishment, based in Harlem, that had long exercised disproportionate influence in New York City. Wills did not qualify for the ballot, so no primary election took place.

2012

Citizens for Responsibility and Ethics in Washington (CREW) named Meeks one of the most corrupt members of Congress in 2011. It was subsequently reported that his continuing ethical and criminal probes would cause his premature exit from Congress, but Meeks has denied this. In October 2011, hiphop artist and law school graduate Mike Scala announced his candidacy in the Democratic primary. Meeks won the primary and was reelected in the November general election with 90% of the vote.

Tenure 

On March 3, 2015, Meeks participated with fellow Democrats in a boycott of the speech delivered by Israeli Prime Minister Benjamin Netanyahu to Congress.

In July 2020, after the primary defeat of House Foreign Affairs Committee chair Eliot Engel, Meeks declared his candidacy for chair. On December 3, 2020, Meeks defeated Joaquin Castro in a caucuswide vote, 148-78.

As of September 2021, Meeks had voted in line with Joe Biden's stated position 100% of the time.

Tax cuts for the wealthy 
In November 2021, Meeks called for increasing the cap on SALT deductions, which would entail tax cuts for the wealthy.

Philippines visit
On August 25, 2007, Silvestre Reyes, chair of the Permanent Select Committee on Intelligence and the Armed Services Committee, and four other representatives visited American troops deployed in the southern Philippines to overview the US-Philippines relationship. Reyes headed the bipartisan delegation, which included Rodney P. Frelinghuysen, member of the Appropriations Committee and the select intelligence oversight panel; Heather Wilson of the Committee on Energy and the Intelligence Committee; Meeks; and Dutch Ruppersberger of the Appropriations and Intelligence Committees. They drove to the base of the Joint Special Operation Task Force Philippines (JSOTFP), a US-led body that trains Filipino soldiers against terror in Barangay Upper Calarian.

Fall of Afghanistan
On the day of the fall of Kabul, Meeks said in a statement that the Taliban victory was "inevitable". He also said, "It is abundantly clear that the Taliban's advance was ultimately inevitable, at least without a commitment to surge tens of thousands of U.S. troops for an unknown span of time. That is a commitment the American public has made clear it does not support."

2013 CREW report
In 2013, Citizens for Responsibility and Ethics in Washington named Meeks as one of the most corrupt politicians in Washington. This was as a result of claims that he purchased a home for over $150,000 less than it was worth, met with former Venezuelan president Hugo Chávez on behalf of a donor, and failure to disclose a private loan on congressional financial statements.

Congressional auto lease
The New York Times reported that Meeks utilizes the option to use tax dollars to lease a car for use as a member of Congress. This option does not exist for Senate members. The lease is forgone by many members of Congress, but Meeks has held the most-expensive lease among all members. He has used tax dollars to lease a 2007 Lexus LS 460 for $998 per month. Meeks was unwilling to provide further comment when questioned by the Times about the lease arrangement, saying, "These are never lighthearted stories."

Malaysia visit
In August 2022, Meeks traveled to Malaysia with House Speaker Nancy Pelosi and other members of Congress as part of Pelosi's Asia tour. Malaysia was their second stop after Singapore. They discussed security challenges, economic opportunities and governance priorities between Malaysia and the U.S.

G20 Bali summit
On October 6, 2022, The United States embassy at Jakarta stated that Meeks represented Pelosi and would deliver the keynote address at the P20 Bali summit's plenary session on "Effective Parliament, Dynamic Democracy". His speech discussed the importance of defending democratic values, combating climate change, strengthening food and energy security, advancing sustainable development and recovery from COVID-19, and deepening inter-parliamentary coordination to address these challenges.

Committee assignments
 Committee on Financial Services
 Subcommittee on Financial Institutions and Consumer Credit
 Committee on Foreign Affairs (Ranking Member)

Caucus memberships
 Co-chair of the Dialogue Caucus
 Co-chair of the Malaysia Caucus
 Co-chair of the Middle East Economic Partnership Caucus
 Co-chair of the Services Caucus
 Co-chair of the Caucus on US Russian Trade and Economic Relations
 House Baltic Caucus
 Congressional Asian Pacific American Caucus
United States Congressional International Conservation Caucus
U.S.-Japan Caucus
Congressional Black Caucus, 
International Conservation Caucus
New Democrat Coalition 
Afterschool Caucuses.

Personal life
Meeks has African-American heritage, and according to DNA analysis, he descends mainly from people of Sierra Leone. His great-grandparents lived in South Carolina when slavery was abolished.

See also
 List of African-American United States representatives

References

External links

 Congressman Gregory W. Meeks official U.S. House website
 Gregory Meeks for Congress
 

 

|-

|-

|-

|-

1953 births
20th-century Methodists
21st-century American politicians
Adelphi University alumni
African-American members of the United States House of Representatives
African-American state legislators in New York (state)
African-American Methodists
American Methodists
American people of Sierra Leonean descent
Democratic Party members of the United States House of Representatives from New York (state)
Howard University School of Law alumni
Living people
Methodists from New York (state)
Democratic Party members of the New York State Assembly
People from East Harlem
People of the African Methodist Episcopal church
Public officeholders of Rockaway, Queens